Mississauga Hospital is a regional and teaching hospital in Mississauga, Ontario, Canada. It provides general medical services to residents of central and southern Mississauga as well as regional stroke, cardiac, and neurological care.

Founded in 1958 as South Peel Hospital, the hospital was renamed to Mississauga Hospital in 1980. After a 1997 government mandate to restructure, the hospital merged with the nearby Queensway General Hospital in Toronto in April 1998 to form a new hospital corporation named Trillium Health Centre. From 1998 to 2011 the hospital was known as Trillium Health Centre Mississauga. The name was reverted to Mississauga Hospital following Trillium Health Centre's merger with Credit Valley Hospital on December 1, 2011 to form Trillium Health Partners.

In 2022, Trillium received a $105 million donation from the Peter Gilgan Foundation, for this hospital and Queensway Health Centre. After the rebuild of the hospital, it will be known as the Peter Gilgan Mississauga Hospital.

Programs and services

Regional Stroke Centre: The Harold G. & June C. Shipp Stroke Centre
Regional Cardiac Centre: Hazel McCallion Centre for Heart Health
Regional Neurosurgery Centre
Internal Medicine and Sub-specialities
Intensive Care
Surgery
Mental Health
Colonel Harland Sanders Family Care Centre
Obstetrics and Gynaecology
Paediatrics
Diagnostic Imaging, Interventional Radiology
Diabetes Management Centre
Emergency Services (24 hours/day)
A specialist SARS clinic operated during the 2003 outbreak
Surgicentre - the largest outpatient surgical centre in North America

Fundraising
The hospital's annual Diwali dinner has become known as one of Mississauga's premier social events.

Bus terminal

The Trillium Hospital Bus Terminal is a MiWay bus terminal located on the northern side of the Mississauga Hospital site, facing the Queensway.

The bus terminal has no ticketing services and contains a bus shelter.

Bus routes
All routes are wheelchair-accessible.

References

Buildings and structures in Mississauga
Hospitals established in 1958
Hospitals in the Regional Municipality of Peel
Hospitals affiliated with the University of Toronto
1958 establishments in Ontario